Nigel Nicolson  (19 January 1917 – 23 September 2004) was an English writer, publisher and politician.

Early life and education
Nicolson was the second son of writers Sir Harold Nicolson and Vita Sackville-West; he had an elder brother Ben, an art historian. The boys grew up in Kent, first at Long Barn, near their mother's ancestral home at Knole, and then at Sissinghurst Castle, where their parents created a famous garden.  Nicolson was sent to board at Summer Fields, a prep school in Oxford; he then attended Eton College and Balliol College, Oxford. During World War II he served with the Grenadier Guards, later writing their official history.

Career
Nicolson wrote many books. He and George Weidenfeld co-founded the publishing house Weidenfeld & Nicolson, of which he was a director from 1948 to 1992. He also worked as a broadcaster and was a member of the Ancient Monuments Board. Although his father had been first a National Labour and then a Labour politician, Nigel Nicolson became active in the Conservative Party and contested Leicester North West in 1950 and Falmouth and Camborne in 1951, without success. He was elected Member of Parliament for Bournemouth East and Christchurch at a by-election in February 1952, when the previous MP, Brendan Bracken, was elevated to the House of Lords. Nicolson was re-elected in the seat in the general election of May 1955.

However, he was uncomfortable within the Conservatives and voted with Labour to abolish hanging and abstained in a vote of confidence in the government over the Suez Crisis. His constituency association called for him to resign and wrote to the Prime Minister to brief against the MP. A ballot of members was called. A controversy relating to his publishing interests broke a few years later, the company's decision to publish the British edition of Vladimir Nabokov's novel Lolita in 1959. Nicolson lost the members' vote and was forced to step down at the general election of October 1959.

Nicolson returned to writing, particularly on heritage and biography. He co-wrote a celebrated 1973 book on his parents, Portrait of a Marriage. It balanced a frank account of his bisexual parents' extramarital affairs (especially Vita Sackville-West's 'elopement' with Violet Trefusis) with their enduring love for each other and caused an uproar when it was published. He edited his father's diaries and, with Joanne Trautmann, the letters of Virginia Woolf. Later, he wrote the "Long Life" column for The Spectator, and a Time of My Life column for The Sunday Telegraph. His autobiography, Long Life, was published in 1997.

Personal life and death
In 1953 Nicolson married Philippa, the daughter of Sir Gervais Tennyson d'Eyncourt, and they had two daughters, Rebecca, a publisher, and Juliet, a historian, and a son, Adam, a writer. Juliet has written about her father and his ancestors in A House Full of Daughters (2016). Adam has revived the home farm at Sissinghurst. Nigel and Philippa divorced in 1970.

Nicolson died on 23 September 2004, at Sissinghurst Castle, in Kent.

Ancestors

Bibliography
The Grenadier Guards in the War of 1939–1945 (Gale & Polden, 1949) with Patrick Forbes
Lord of the Isles: Lord Leverhulme in the Hebrides (Weidenfeld & Nicolson, 1960)
People and Parliament (Weidenfeld & Nicolson, 1958)
The United Nations: A Reply to Its Critics (1963)
Sissinghurst Castle: An Illustrated History (Headley Bros, 1964)
Great Houses of Britain (Weidenfeld & Nicolson, 1965)
Diaries & Letters of Harold Nicolson (Collins, 1966–68) three volumes, editor
Great Houses of The Western World (G. P. Putnam and Sons, 1968)
Alex: The Life of Field Marshal Earl Alexander of Tunis (Weidenfeld & Nicolson, 1973)
Portrait of a Marriage (Weidenfeld and Nicolson, 1973)
Letters of Virginia Woolf (The Hogarth Press, 1975–1980) six volumes, editor
The Himalayas (Time-Life Books, 1975)(The World's Wild Places)
Mary Curzon (Weidenfeld & Nicolson, 1977)
The National Trust for Places of Historic Interest or Natural Beauty National Trust Book of Great Houses in Britain (David R Godinez, 1978)
Napoleon 1812 (Weidenfeld and Nicolson, 1985)
Lady Curzon's India: Letters of a Vicereine (Weidenfeld & Nicolson, 1985)
Two Roads to Dodge City (Weidenfeld & Nicolson, 1986) with Adam Nicolson
The Village in History (Weidenfeld & Nicolson, 1988) with Graham Nicholson and Jane Fawcett
Counties of Britain: A Tudor Atlas by John Speed (Pavilion Books, 1988) with Alasdair Hawkyard
Kent (Weidenfeld & Nicolson, 1988)
The World of Jane Austen (Weidenfeld & Nicolson, 1991)
Vita and Harold : The Letters of Vita Sackville-West and Harold Nicolson (G. P. Putnam's Sons, 1992) editor
A Long Life: Memoirs (Weidenfeld & Nicolson, 1997)
Virginia Woolf (Weidenfeld & Nicolson, 2000) (Lives series)
Fanny Burney: The Mother of English Fiction (Short Books, 2002)
Vita Sackville-West : Selected Writings (Palgrave Macmillan, 2002) editor with Mary Ann Caws
The Queen and Us: The Second Elizabethan Age ( Weidenfeld & Nicolson, 2003)

See also

List of Bloomsbury Group people

References

External links
 
 Appearance on Desert Island Discs 12 March 1995

1917 births
2004 deaths
Alumni of Balliol College, Oxford
Grenadier Guards officers
Conservative Party (UK) MPs for English constituencies
Officers of the Order of the British Empire
People educated at Eton College
People educated at Summer Fields School
UK MPs 1951–1955
UK MPs 1955–1959
Bloomsbury Group biographers
20th-century biographers
British Army personnel of World War II
Military personnel from London
Nigel